Viktor Petrovich Vlasov (September 1, 1925 – November 2002) was a Russian basketball player who competed for the Soviet Union in the 1952 Summer Olympics. He was born in Moscow and served in the Soviet military in World War II. He was a member of the Soviet team, which won the silver medal. He trained at Dynamo in Moscow.

References

1925 births
2002 deaths
Russian men's basketball players
Soviet men's basketball players
Olympic basketball players of the Soviet Union
Basketball players at the 1952 Summer Olympics
Olympic silver medalists for the Soviet Union
Basketball players from Moscow
People from Moscow Governorate
BC Dynamo Moscow players
FIBA EuroBasket-winning players
Olympic medalists in basketball
Medalists at the 1952 Summer Olympics
Soviet military personnel of World War II
Honoured Masters of Sport of the USSR